Pierre Vladimiroff, or Pyotr Nikolayevich Vladimirov (born February 13, 1893 in Gatchina, Saint Petersburg Governorate, Russian Empire – died November 25, 1970 in New York City, United States), was a Russian dancer and teacher.

Vladimirov graduated from the Imperial Ballet School in 1911 and remained a member of the Imperial Ballet  company until 1918. In 1915, he received the title of the first dancer.

In 1920, he and his later wife Felia Doubrovska emigrated to the West, where they joined the Ballets Russes; all roles of Vaslav Nijinsky went to Pierre Vladimiroff (Nijinsky left the Diaghilev company in 1917). He danced the prince in the 1921 production The Sleeping Princess. Later, he danced with the Mordkin Ballet and joined Anna Pavlova's company on Pavlova's last tour, becoming her last partner.

From 1934 to 1967, he taught at the School of American Ballet, being the first teacher of the newly founded school to teach the male students.

Among his students  were Todd Bolender, John Taras, Willam Christensen, William Dollar, Nicholas Magallanes, Francisco Moncion, Tanaquil LeClercq, and Maria Tallchief.

He was for some time a lover of Mathilde Kschessinska, who at this time was living with Andrei Vladimirovich  Romanov. Andrei Romanov called Pierre Vladimiroff to a duel and shot him in the nose.

See also
List of Russian ballet dancers

References

External links

Photos, National Portrait Gallery, London
ru: Ballet Encyclopedia

1893 births
1970 deaths
People from Gatchina
People from Tsarskoselsky Uyezd
Male ballet dancers from the Russian Empire
Ballets Russes dancers
Ballet teachers
White Russian emigrants to the United States
Russian male ballet dancers